In graph theory, the zig-zag product of regular graphs , denoted by , is a binary operation which takes a large graph and a small graph and produces a graph that approximately inherits the size of the large one but the degree of the small one.

When the zig-zag product was first introduced, it was used for the explicit construction of constant degree expanders and extractors. Later on, the zig-zag product was used in computational complexity theory to prove that symmetric logspace and logspace are equal .

Definition
The zig-zag product  is defined to be the -regular graph on  whose rotation map  is as follows:
:
 Let .
 Let .
 Let .
 Output .

Properties

Reduction of the degree
It is immediate from the definition of the zigzag product that it transforms a graph  to a new graph which is -regular. Roughly speaking, by amplifying each vertex of  into a cloud of the size of  the product in fact splits the edges of each original vertex between the vertices of the cloud that replace it.

Spectral gap preservation
The expansion of a graph can be measured by its spectral gap, with an important property of the zigzag product the preservation of the spectral gap.

Formally: Define a -graph as any -regular graph on  vertices, whose second largest eigenvalue (of the associated random walk) has absolute value at most .

Let  be a -graph and  be a -graph, then  is a -graph, where .

Connectivity preservation

Applications

Construction of constant degree expanders
In 2002 Omer Reingold, Salil Vadhan, and Avi Wigderson gave a simple, explicit combinatorial construction of constant-degree expander graphs. The construction is iterative, and needs as a basic building block a single, expander of constant size. In each iteration the zigzag product is used in order to generate another graph whose size is increased but its degree and expansion remains unchanged. This process continues, yielding arbitrarily large expanders.

From the properties of the zigzag product mentioned above, we see that the product of a large graph with a small graph, inherits a size similar to the large graph, and degree similar to the small graph, while preserving its expansion properties from both, thus enabling to increase the size of the expander without deleterious effects.

Solving the undirected s-t connectivity problem in logarithmic space

In 2005 Omer Reingold introduced an algorithm that solves the undirected st-connectivity problem, the problem of testing whether there is a path between two given vertices in an undirected graph, using only logarithmic space. The algorithm relies heavily on the zigzag product.

Roughly speaking, in order to solve the undirected s-t connectivity problem in logarithmic space, the input graph is transformed, using a combination of powering and the zigzag product, into a constant-degree regular graph with a logarithmic diameter. The power product increases the expansion (hence reduces the diameter) at the price of increasing the degree, and the zigzag product is used to reduce the degree while preserving the expansion.

See also
Graph operations

References
 .
 .
 .

Graph products